MV Loch Alainn is a Caledonian Maritime Assets Limited ferry built in 1997 and operated by Caledonian MacBrayne. Berthing problems on her intended route at Fishnish meant she began a decade of service at Largs. Since 2007, she has operated across the Sound of Barra.

History
Loch Alainn was built for the new service from Fishnish to Lochaline. Launched in April 1997, she entered service in July. After just three weeks on her intended route, she developed a serious engine failure and was towed to dry dock on the Clyde, never to return to her intended route. In January 1999, she lost steering power approaching Largs slipway and was blown into the pier. Superficial damage required further time off for repairs.

Layout
Loch Alainn is essentially a larger version of the 1996 . Her car deck can take four lanes of cars, with a passenger lounge on the starboard side and an open deck directly above that. The bridge is suspended over the car deck.

Service
Loch Alainn entered service in July 1997, on the Colintraive – Rhubodach route, allowing  to move to Largs. After a short while she moved to the Sound of Mull to take over her intended route, the Fishnish – Lochaline crossing, while  moved south to Colintraive. With a slightly deeper draught than her predecessor, she had problems at low tide at Fishnish.  Her ramps required modification soon after her arrival. After just three weeks, she broke down with a serious engine failure and was towed to dry dock on the Clyde. 

After repairs, Loch Alainn re-entered service on the Colintraive service in February 1998. She then moved to Largs, becoming the main Cumbrae vessel from 14 May, with  joining her through the summers.

She provided an emergency, round-the-clock service on the Tarbert - Portavadie crossing, following a landslide which completely blocked the A83 road north of Tarbert, leaving Kintyre isolated.

Early in 2007, she underwent successful berthing trials at Ardmhor and Eriskay in the Western Isles. Loch Alainn was replaced at Largs, by the new  and left the Clyde on 2 July. Loch Alainn became the dedicated Sound of Barra ferry, replacing  on this increasingly busy route.

References

Barra
Caledonian MacBrayne
1997 ships
Ships built in Scotland